Brunnenthal can refer to any of the following:
Brunnenthal, Austria, a town in the district of Schärding in Upper Austria
Brunnenthal, Switzerland